Robert Wyvil (or Wyvill or Wyville) was a medieval Bishop of Salisbury.

Wyvil was keeper of the Privy Seal of Edward, duke of Aquitaine in 1326 when he was named on 26 October Lord Privy Seal, which office he held until the early part of 1327.

Wyvil was nominated to the see of Salisbury on 16 April 1330 and consecrated on 15 July 1330. He had a reputation for stressing his authority and defending the rights of his see: Wyvil was the first Salisbury bishop to use 'Sarum' on his seal, issued a mandate against a man impersonating a hermit, and nearly used a knight in a trial by combat to maintain the cathedral's ownership of Sherborne Castle.

He died on 4 September 1375.

Citations

References

 

Bishops of Salisbury
Lords Privy Seal
1375 deaths
14th-century English Roman Catholic bishops
Year of birth unknown